Tom Dermody is an American politician and former member of the Indiana House of Representatives, representing the 20th District from 2006 to 2016. He has served as a board member for LaPorte Community Schools and as a sales representative.

In the 2006 Republican primary, Dermody defeated thirteen term incumbent Mary Kay Budak in the 2006 primary, at least in part due to her support for the Indiana Toll Road lease. Dermody was elected in the 2006 general election. He chose not to run for re-election in 2016.

On May 27, 2018, Dermody announced his candidacy for mayor of LaPorte, Indiana.

References

External links
Representative Tom Dermody official Indiana State Legislature site
 

Living people
Republican Party members of the Indiana House of Representatives
21st-century American politicians
Year of birth missing (living people)